Ed Ayres may refer to:

Ed Ayres (environmentalist) (born 1941), American environmentalist, writer and marathon runner
Ed Le Brocq (previously Ed Ayres), Australian musician, radio presenter and writer

See also
Edward L. Ayers (born 1942), American historian